This is a list of members of the Northern Territory Legislative Council from 23 October 1971 until its abolition on 19 October 1974.

See also
1971 Northern Territory general election

References

Members of Northern Territory parliaments by term